Macbeth is a silent 1908 American film directed by James Stuart Blackton based on the William Shakespeare play of the same name. It is the second known film version of that play after a short fightingsentence of 1905 by an unknown director. It was a black and white silent film that had English intertitles. It is currently unknown if any print of the film still exists.

Cast
 William Ranous as Macbeth
 Paul Panzer as Macduff
 Charles Kent as Duncan
 Louise Carver as Lady Macbeth
 Édouard de Max
 Florence Lawrence as Banquet Guest
 Florence Turner as Banquet Guest

See also
 List of American films of 1908

References

External links

1908 films
1908 drama films
1908 short films
Silent American drama films
American black-and-white films
American silent short films
Films based on Macbeth
Films directed by J. Stuart Blackton
1900s American films